Šibenik, historically known as Sebenico, is a historic city in Croatia, located in central Dalmatia, where the river Krka flows into the Adriatic Sea. Šibenik is a political, educational, transport, industrial and tourist center of Šibenik-Knin County, and is also the third-largest city in the Dalmatian region. As of 2011, the city has 34,302 inhabitants, while the municipality has 46,332 inhabitants.

History

Etymology 

There are multiple interpretations of how Šibenik was named. In his fifteenth century book De situ Illiriae et civitate Sibenici, Juraj Šižgorić describes the name and location of Šibenik. He attributes the name of the city to it being surrounded by a palisade made of šibe (sticks, singular being šiba). Another interpretation is associated with the forest through the Latin toponym "Sibinicum", which covered a narrower microregion within Šibenik on and around the area of St. Michael's Fortress.

Early history
Unlike other cities along the Adriatic coast, which were established by Greeks, Illyrians and Romans, Šibenik was founded by Croats. Excavations of the castle of St. Michael, have since proven that the place was inhabited long before the actual arrival of the Croats. It was mentioned for the first time under its present name in 1066 in a Charter of the Croatian King Petar Krešimir IV and, for a period of time, it was a seat of this Croatian King. For that reason, Šibenik is also called "Krešimirov grad" (Krešimir's city).

Between the 11th and 12th centuries, Šibenik was tossed back and forth among Venice, Byzantium, and Hungary. It was conquered by the Republic of Venice in 1116, who held it until 1124, when they briefly lost it to the Byzantine Empire, and then held it again until 1133 when it was retaken by the Kingdom of Hungary. It would change hands among the aforementioned states several more times until 1180.

The city was given the status of a town in 1167 from Stephen III of Hungary. It received its own diocese in 1298.

Under Venice and the Habsburgs
The city, like the rest of Dalmatia, initially resisted the Venetian Republic, but it was taken over after a three-year war in 1412. Under Venetian rule, Šibenik became in 1412 the seat of the main customs office and the seat of the salt consumers office with a monopoly on the salt trade in Chioggia and on the whole Adriatic Sea.

In August 1417, Venetian authorities were concerned with the "Morlachs and other Slavs" from the hinterland, that were a threat to security in Šibenik. The Ottoman Empire started to threaten Šibenik (known as Sebenico), as part of their struggle against Venice, at the end of the 15th century, but they never succeeded in conquering it. In the 16th century, St. Nicholas Fortress was built and, by the 17th century, its fortifications were improved again by the fortresses of St. John (Tanaja) and Šubićevac (Barone).

The Morlachs started settling Šibenik during the Cretan War (1645–69).

The fall of the Republic of Venice in 1797 brought Sebenico under the authority of the Habsburg monarchy.

After the Congress of Vienna until 1918, the town was (again) part of the Austrian monarchy (Austria side after the compromise of 1867), head of the district of the same name, one of the 13 Bezirkshauptmannschaften in Kingdom of Dalmatia. The Italian name Sebenico only was used until around 1871.

In 1872, at the time in the Kingdom of Dalmatia, Ante Šupuk became the town's first Croat mayor elected under universal suffrage. He was instrumental in the process of the modernization of the city, and is particularly remembered for the 1895 project to provide street lights powered by the early AC Jaruga Hydroelectric Power Plant. On 28 August 1895, Šibenik became the world's first city with alternating current-powered street lights.

20th century
During World War I, the Austro-Hungarian navy used the port facilities here, and the light cruisers and destroyers which escaped the Allied force after the battle of Cape Rodoni (or Gargano) returned to safety here, where some battleships were based. After the war Šibenik was occupied by the Kingdom of Italy until 12 June 1921. As a result of the Treaty of Rapallo, the Italians gave up their claim to the city and it became a part of the Kingdom of Serbs, Croats and Slovenes. After the World War I, the exodus of the Dalmatian Italians from the city began. During World War II, Šibenik was annexed by Italy and was part of the Italian Governorate of Dalmatia from 1941 to 1943 being part of the province of Zara. Communist partisans liberated Šibenik on 3 November 1944.

After World War II it became a part of the SFR Yugoslavia until Croatia declared independence in 1991.

During the Croatian War of Independence (1991–95), Šibenik was heavily attacked by the Yugoslav National Army and Serbian paramilitary troops. Although under-armed, the nascent Croatian army and the people of Šibenik managed to defend the city. The battle lasted for six days (16–22 September), often referred to as the "September battle". The bombings damaged numerous buildings and monuments, including the dome of the Šibenik Cathedral of St James and the 1870-built theatre building.

In an August 1995 military operation, the Croatian Army defeated the Serb forces and reconquered the occupied areas, which allowed the region to recover from the war and continue to develop as the centre of Šibenik-Knin county. Since then, the damaged areas of the city have been fully restored.

Climate

Šibenik has a mediterranean climate (Csa), with mild, humid winters and hot, dry summers. January and February are the coldest months, July and August are the hottest months. The Köppen Climate Classification subtype for this climate is "Csa" (Mediterranean Climate).

Main sights 

The central church in Šibenik, the Šibenik Cathedral of St James, is on the UNESCO World Heritage list.

Several successive architects built it completely in stone between 1431 and 1536, both in Gothic and in Renaissance style. The interlocking stone slabs of the cathedral's roof were damaged when the city was shelled by Yugoslav forces in 1991.  The damage has since been repaired.

Fortifications in Šibenik 

In the city of Šibenik there are four fortresses, each of which has views of the city, sea and nearby islands. The fortresses are now tourist sightseeing destinations.
 St. Nicholas Fortress is a fortress located on the island of Ljuljevac, at the entrance to the St. Anthony Channel, across from the Jadrija beach lighthouse. It is included in UNESCO's World Heritage Site list as part of Venetian Works of Defence between 15th and 17th centuries: Stato da Terra – western Stato da Mar in 2017.
 St. Michael's Fortress in historic town centre
 St. John Fortress
 Barone Fortress

Natural heritage 

Culture
The composer Jakov Gotovac founded the city's "Philharmonia Society" in 1922. The 19th century composer Franz von Suppé was part of the city's cultural fabric, as he was a native of nearby Split.

Each summer, a number of concerts and events take place in the city, many of them in the St. Michael Fortress. Also, starting in 2016 on a nearby island of Obonjan ( southwest of the city), an annual music, art, health and workshop festival is being held.

The annual Šibenik International Children's Festival (Međunarodni Dječji Festival) takes place every summer and hosts children's workshops, plays and other activities.
From 2011 to 2013 the Terraneo festival (music festival) was held in August on a yearly basis on a former military area in Šibenik, and since 2014 Šibenik (and other nearby towns) are the home of its spiritual successor Super Uho festival. Šibenik hosts the Dalmatian Chanson Evenings festival (Večeri Dalmatinske Šansone), held in the second half of August.

Sports 
As famous sports town, Šibenik is the hometown of many successful athletes: Aleksandar Petrović, Dražen Petrović, Perica Bukić, Ivica Žurić, Predrag Šarić, Dario Šarić, Vanda Baranović-Urukalo, Danira Nakić, Nik Slavica, Miro Bilan, Dražan Jerković, Petar Nadoveza, Krasnodar Rora, Dean Računica, Mladen Pralija, Ante Rukavina, Duje Ćaleta-Car, Mile Nakić, Franko Nakić, Siniša Belamarić, Renato Vrbičić, Ivica Tucak, Andrija Komadina, Miro Jurić, Antonio Petković, Neven Spahija, Antonija Sandrić, Mate Maleš, Stipe Bralić, Franco Jelovčić, Nives Radić, Karmela Makelja, and many others.

Basketball 
The famous multi-purpose Baldekin Sports Hall was the home arena of KK Šibenik, the famous basketball club which played in the final of the FIBA Korać Cup twice, as well as in the final of the 1982–83 Yugoslav league championship. The team was led by then 19-year-old Dražen Petrović.

The women's basketball club, ŽKK Šibenik, is among the most successful women's basketball clubs in Croatia, winning the Yugoslav league title in 1991, Yugoslav Cup title twice, Croatian league title four times, Croatian Cup four times, Adriatic league five times, and the Vojko Herksel Cup four times.

The dissolved men's basketball club, Jolly Jadranska banka, played in the play-offs semifinals of the Croatian league championship twice, as well as in the Krešimir Ćosić Cup final game in the 2016–17 season.

The biggest success of GKK Šibenka, a club founded in 2010 following the dissolution of the famous KK Šibenik, came in the 2016–17 Croatian league championship season, when the club played the play-offs semifinals against powerhouse Cibona Zagreb. Šibenka lost to Cibona in the semifinals.

Football 
Šubićevac stadium, which is located in the neighbourhood of the same name, has been the home ground of the HNK Šibenik football club, which had played many years in the Yugoslav Second League, and later many years in the Croatian First League. In the 2009–10 season, the club played in the Croatian Cup final, which they lost to powerhouse Hajduk Split. As of 2021, the club again competes in the Croatian First League.

Water polo 
The dissolved water polo club, VK Šibenik, is considered to be one of the best men's clubs in former Yugoslavia, winning the second place in the 1986–87 domestic league season. It also played in the LEN Euro Cup final game of the 2006–07 season, but lost to Sintez Kazan, as well as the club played in the LEN Champions League in the 2008–09 season, led both times by Ivica Tucak, today the head coach of the senior men's Croatian national team.

Croatian water polo internationals, Perica Bukić and Renato Vrbičić, are Olympic medalists. They won gold medals at the 1996 Summer Olympics in Atlanta. Ivica Tucak has been the most successful coach of the senior men's Croatian national team ever.

Demographics 

In the 2011 Croatian census, Šibenik's total city population is 46,332 which makes it the tenth-largest city in Croatia, with 34,302 in the urban settlement.

Of Šibenik's citizens, 94.02% were ethnic Croats.

The list of settlements is as follows:

 Boraja, population 249
 Brnjica, population 72
 Brodarica, population 2,534
 Čvrljevo, population 64
 Danilo, population 376
 Danilo Biranj, population 442
 Danilo Kraljice, population 104
 Donje Polje, population 267
 Dubrava kod Šibenika, population 1,185
 Goriš, population 147
 Gradina, population 303
 Grebaštica, population 937
 Jadrtovac, population 171
 Kaprije, population 189
 Konjevrate, population 173
 Krapanj, population 170
 Lepenica, population 68
 Lozovac, population 368
 Mravnica, population 70
 Perković, population 111
 Podine, population 26
 Radonić, population 79
 Raslina, population 567
 Sitno Donje, population 561
 Slivno, population 110
 Šibenik, population 34,302
 Vrpolje, population 776
 Vrsno, population 67
 Zaton, population 978
 Zlarin, population 284
 Žaborić, population 479
 Žirje, population 103

Economy

Port
Šibenik is one of the best protected ports on the Croatian Adriatic and is situated on the estuary of the Krka River. The approach channel is navigable by ships up to 50,000 tonnes deadweight. The port itself has depths up to 40 m.

Transportation 
Šibenik has a railway station which is a terminus of the local Perković - Šibenik railway, a branch of M604 railway connecting Zagreb and Split via Knin. The train services are operated by Croatian Railways.

Bus station Šibenik is connected by daily bus lines with the surrounding towns such as Vodice, Pirovac, Biograd na Moru. There are good connections to major cities across Croatia: Rijeka, Crikvenica, Zagreb, Osijek, Zadar, Split, Makarska, Dubrovnik.

International relations 
Šibenik is twinned with:
 Civitanova Marche (since 2002)
 San Benedetto del Tronto 
 Kreis Herford 
 Voiron
 Vukovar (since 2011)
 Pineto (since 2016)
 Razlog (since 2016)
 Veszprém

Image gallery

See also
List of people from Šibenik
Jadrija
Antun Vrančić High School
Šibenik railway station
Stato da Màr

References

Further reading

External links 

 Official Šibenik City website
 Croatian Tourist Board
 Photo gallery of Šibenik 

 
Cities and towns in Croatia
Kingdom of Dalmatia
Populated coastal places in Croatia
Spa towns in Croatia
Port cities and towns of the Adriatic Sea
Former capitals of Croatia
Populated places in Šibenik-Knin County
11th-century establishments in Croatia
1066 establishments in Europe
Ports and harbours of Croatia
Territories of the Republic of Venice